is a Japanese tokusatsu superhero television series. Gorenger, created by Shotaro Ishinomori, was the first in the long-running Super Sentai metaseries of tokusatsu programming. The series aired on NET (now TV Asahi) from April 5, 1975, to March 26, 1977, and was replaced by J.A.K.Q. Dengekitai for 84 episodes. Toei distributes the series internationally under the title Five Rangers. The series was released in the Philippines under the title Star Rangers.

Plot
When world peace is threatened by the emergence of a terrorist group called the Black Cross Army, EAGLE (The Earth Guard League) is formed to combat the threat. The Black Cross Army sends five operatives to destroy each EAGLE branch in Japan, killing all except for five agents. These surviving agents are summoned to a secret base located underneath the snack shop "Gon", where they are recruited by EAGLE Japan's commander, Gonpachi Edogawa. They become the Himitsu Sentai Gorengers and are given electronic battlesuits that endow them with superhuman strength and speed. The five dedicate themselves to stopping the Black Cross Army and its leader, the Black Cross Führer.

Characters

Gorengers
:The 24-year-old younger brother of the Kantō EAGLE base captain, Tsuyoshi and his teammates were playing soccer when the Black Cross Army launched the attack that killed his brother. Tsuyoshi is trained in combat planning and strategy. He also carries the  tranquilizer gun. Tsuyoshi appeared in the final episode of Kaizoku Sentai Gokaiger, receiving his powers back in the form of the Akarenger Key as the Gokaigers left Earth.
: 25-years-old and the oldest member of the Gorenger team. Akira was training in the snowy region of Tōhoku when the Black Cross Army attacked. He is a marksmanship instructor, skilled in archery and piloting. He wants to become a racing driver. As the blue-colored , he is the second-in-command. He pilots the Variblune, and later the Varidorin.
The moniker of Kirenger was used by its original user and his temporary successor.
 (1–54 & 67–84): 23-years-old. Called Dai-chan by Akira, Peggy, and Yoko, Daita is a jovial engineering recruit at EAGLE's Kyushu branch who was training with his comrades when the Black Cross Army attacked. Adept in mechanics and mathematics, he has difficulty solving simple word puzzles and riddles. As a judo champion, Daita is physically strong.  Daita was later promoted to Chief of EAGLE's Kyushu branch but soon returned to active duty with the Gorengers after his replacement is killed by the Black Cross Army.
 (55–67): After Daita became the commander of the Kyushu branch for a time, Daigoro replaced him. Daigoro was killed by a flying blade from Can Opener Mask.
: 18-years-old. Peggy worked at EAGLE's Hokkaido branch as a chemical analyst and weapons engineer specializing in explosives. Fashion-conscious, Peggy often wears go-go boots and short hip-hugging hot pants. She also carries the  throwing shuriken and the high impact .
: 17-years-old, Kenji is the youngest member of the team. Kenji was tending to pigeons on a rooftop at EAGLE's Kansai branch when the Black Cross Army attacked, thus saving him from the poison gas used in the attack. He has a happy-go-lucky temperament.

Other EAGLE characters
: Commander of EAGLE's Japan branch. When operating in public, Gonpachi disguises himself as the cook at the snack shop , which is the secret entrance to the Gorengers' headquarters. The shop later becomes the fruit parlor Gon.
: A trio of secretaries and secret agents who assists Commander Edogawa:  (a.k.a. Agent 007),  (a.k.a. Agent 009). They act behind the scenes but occasionally help the Gorengers in the field.

Black Cross Army
The  is a terrorist group led by the Black Cross Führer whose goal is the eradication of the human race and the absolute domination of the world. They use advanced technology and magic to create an army of superhuman operatives to attack EAGLE and the Gorengers. Most of the Black Cross operatives are humans who have been enhanced through surgery. They had various secret bases across the globe. The main headquarters was the flying , which orbited high above the ground.
: As the leader of the Black Cross Army, he was often referred to as the "Machine Monster". He could not be easily killed by a conventional weapon. He had supernatural powers and was supremely intelligent. He kept his identity a secret even among his generals but revealed himself as a sentient alien machine construct that was part of the Black Cross Castle. He could also disguise himself as either a male or female human. He was destroyed when the Gorengers launched their Five-Star Cassiopea Attack.
: The so-called . He was a ruthless tyrant who was renowned for his successive victories in Africa. He was called to Japan to eliminate the Gorengers by any means necessary, though his cowardice interferes with his operations.
: The so-called , he was recruited from Black Cross Army's Gobi Desert operations. Vain and prideful, he often lets his ego disrupt his operations.
: He was recruited from the volcanic Eldgja region in Iceland. He is the leader of the ruthless . He commanded his own mobile battle fortress dubbed . He had the ability to fire napalm missiles from the top of his "volcano" Mask. He is impervious to the Gorengers' weapons and is a master combatant.
: Black Cross Army's top general. A supernatural entity that was mystically awoken through black magic and Black Cross Führer's powers. Golden Mask took command of Black Cross Army's elite . He is versed in sorcery and keenly interested in astrology. He can repel most of the Gorengers' attacks.
: A renegade Black Cross Army operative who was imprisoned by Black Cross Führer for his recklessness and rebelliousness. He was later freed by Black Cross Führer in exchange for his help in destroying the Gorengers. He was an incredibly strong fighter and was impervious to harm. Wielded a mighty dao that could destroy almost any object.
 is the Black Cross Army's field agents who cause many types of chaos and disorder wherever they go. They are mainly humanoid machines with strange masks that represent their ability and skills in the field, with the ability to continuously upgrade themselves through the continued research and developments of the Black Cross Army. These humanoids can have abilities to change into other objects to help with infiltration or investigations or to assist in their chaos-causing objectives. 
: The faceless leather-suited foot soldiers of the Black Cross, altered with enhanced strength and speed and brainwashed to be absolutely loyal. They carry a variety of weapons including machine guns, bazookas, and iron swords. They can be heard shouting "Hoi" when attacking their victims.

Episodes
Episodes aired on Saturdays at 7:30 pm JST.

Films
: Released on July 26, 1975. The movie version of episode 6.
: Released on December 20, 1975. The movie version of episode 15.
: Released on March 20, 1976. The movie version of episode 36.
: Released on December 19, 1976. The movie version of episode 54.
: Released on July 18, 1976.
: Released on March 18, 1978.

Manga
The series was adapted into a manga written and drawn by Ishinomori and published in Weekly Shōnen Sunday magazine from May 4, 1975, to August 17, 1975. In this series, the Gorengers are all teenagers and Tsuyoshi's father is the head of EAGLE's Kanto branch. Tsuyoshi Kaijo is given the powers of the Akarenger by his father before he is murdered by the Black Cross Army. Tsuyoshi becomes Akarenger and recruits the others to form the Gorengers and avenge his father's death. Seven Seas Entertainment licensed the manga outside Japan for North American territories.

Cast
Tsuyoshi Kaijo: 
Akira Shinmei: 
Daita Oiwa: 
Daigoro Kumano: 
Peggy Matsuyama: 
Kenji Asuka: 
Yoko Kato: 
Tomoko Hayashi: 
Haruko Nakamura: 
: 
Black Cross Führer: ,  (Voicing the role in episodes 54 & 55)
Gonpachi Edogawa:

Voice actors
: 
: 
: 
: , Shōzō Iizuka (45–54)
: Shōzō Iizuka
Narrator: :

Songs
 Opening theme

Lyrics: Shotaro Ishinomori
Composition & arrangement: Chumei Watanabe
Artists: Isao Sasaki, Mitsuko Horie, & Columbia Yurikago Kai

 Ending themes

Lyrics: Saburo Yatsude
Composition & Arrangement: Chumei Watanabe
Artist: Isao Sasaki & Koorogi '73
Episodes: 1–63

Lyrics: Shotaro Ishinomori
Composition & Arrangement: Chumei Watanabe
Artists: Isao Sasaki, Koorogi '73, & Wilbees
Episodes: 64–84

International Broadcasts and Home Video
In the United States, the original Japanese version was broadcast in Hawaii on Honolulu's KIKU-TV with English subtitles from 1975 through 1976, and the actors made personal appearances to promote the series. An unsubtitled version was also broadcast in California, on Sacramento's KMUV-TV in 1976, San Francisco's KEMO-TV in 1977.
In the Philippines, Gorenger was dubbed into English and released as Star Rangers in 1978 and shown on Saturday afternoon on  In this version, aside from their color designations, the Gorengers also had numeric designations, in order of their introduction to the enemy prior to battle: Akarenger = Star 1, Aorenger = Star 2, Kirenger = Star 3, Momorenger = Star 4, and Midorenger = Star 5. 
In Hong Kong, the series aired on the now-defunct Commercial Television station with a Cantonese Chinese dub from July 1, 1978, until August 19, 1978. But the channel ceased operations, causing the series to be cut short.
In Thailand, the series aired on Channel 7 originally with a Thai Dub and currently licensed by Rose Media Entertainment. It also later aired on Channel 5 and also the Gang Cartoon Channel around 2009 with license currently owned by TIGA Company.

References

External links
Super-Sentai.net 

1970s Japanese television series
1975 Japanese television series debuts
1975 manga
1977 Japanese television series endings
Espionage television series
Seven Seas Entertainment titles
Shogakukan manga
Shōnen manga
Shotaro Ishinomori
Super Sentai
TV Asahi original programming
Japanese action television series